Blue Pearl are an English electronic music duo consisting of American female singer Durga McBroom and British musician Youth (Martin Glover). They charted six times on the UK singles chart and had two songs reach the US Billboard Hot Dance Club Play chart.

"Naked in the Rain" was a No. 4 hit in the UK Singles Chart and a No. 5 dance hit in the US in 1990, which was originally issued on blue vinyl.  It was followed by "(Can You) Feel the Passion" (whose melody samples Bizarre Inc's "Playing with Knives"), which hit No. 1 on both Billboard'''s Dance Club Play and the UK Dance Chart in 1992, reaching No. 14 on the UK Singles Chart. They also had a Top 40 hit in the UK Singles Chart in November 1990 with the No. 31 hit, "Little Brother".

As McBroom is a backing vocalist for Pink Floyd, their records feature guest appearances from David Gilmour and Richard Wright. A couple of decades later, both Youth and McBroom went on to be involved in the completion of Pink Floyd's 2014 album The Endless River, which charted at number 1 in the UK charts.

Discography
AlbumsNaked'' (1990) UK No. 58

Singles

See also
List of Billboard number-one dance club songs
List of artists who reached number one on the US Dance chart

References

American house music groups
American dance music groups
American electronic music groups
British house music groups
British dance music groups
British electronic music groups